John J. Burns (born 1959) is an American politician who served as the Attorney General of Alaska from 2010 to 2012.

Alaska Attorney General 
He was appointed by Sean Parnell in December 2010 and resigned in January 2012.

He was preceded by Daniel S. Sullivan, who went on to become a U.S. Senator. Burns was succeeded in office by Michael Geraghty.

References 

1959 births
Living people
Alaska Attorneys General